Chorthippus maritimus is a species of slant-faced grasshopper in the family Acrididae. It is found in Asia.

Subspecies
These subspecies belong to the species Chorthippus maritimus:
 Chorthippus maritimus huabeiensis Xia & Jin, 1982
 Chorthippus maritimus insularis (Storozhenko, 2002)
 Chorthippus maritimus jacutus (Storozhenko, 2002)
 Chorthippus maritimus karakalensis Sychev & Woznessenskij, 1995
 Chorthippus maritimus maritimus Mistshenko, 1951
 Chorthippus maritimus saitorum (Ishikawa, 2002)

References

Further reading

External links

 

maritimus